NCAA Season 91 is the 2015–16 collegiate athletic year of the National Collegiate Athletic Association in the Philippines. It is hosted by Mapua Institute of Technology and was opened on June 27, 2015, at the Mall of Asia Arena in Pasay hosted by Andrei Felix and Myrtle Sarrosa and ended on March 8, 2016, with the Cheerleading Competition and closing ceremonies, as the final event held at the MOA Arena, also hosted by Felix and Sarrosa, together with Anton Roxas, Migs Bustos, Ceej Tantengco and Roxanne Montealegre.

This will be the first season after the NCAA renewed broadcasting deal with ABS-CBN Sports, after a 3-year contract with Sports5. 
ABS-CBN has covered the NCAA Games from 2002 to 2011 until it left for Sports5/AKTV in the 88th Season.

Lyceum of the Philippines University and Emilio Aguinaldo College are accredited as full members of the NCAA, based from their performance in Season 90. In the end of the season, San Beda College regain the general championship title, dethroning De La Salle-College of Saint Benilde in seniors, and also having a 3-peat championship for the juniors division.

Basketball

Basketball tournaments were officially opened on June 27, 2015, at the Mall of Asia Arena. Proceeding games elimination round games, which is a double round robin tournament, were held at the Filoil Flying V Arena. The top four teams qualify for the semifinals, where the higher-seeded team possesses the twice-to-beat advantage. The winners qualify to the best-of-three finals. The playoffs were held at the Mall of Asia Arena.

Seniors' tournament

Elimination round

Playoffs

Awards
Most Valuable Player: Allwell Oraeme ( Mapua)
Rookie of the Year: Allwell Oraeme ( Mapua)

Juniors' tournament

Elimination round

Playoffs

Awards
Most Valuable Player: Michael Enriquez ( Mapua)
Rookie of the Year: Lars Sunga ( Arellano)

Volleyball

The volleyball tournament started on November 30, 2015, at the Filoil Flying V Arena. Collegio de San Juan de Letran will be the event host. All teams participate in an elimination round which is a round robin tournament. The top four teams qualify in the semifinals, where the unbeaten team bounces through the finals, with a thrice-to-beat advantage, higher-seeded team possesses the twice-to-beat advantage, or qualify to the first round. The winners qualify to the finals.

Men's tournament

Elimination round

Playoffs

Awards
 Most Valuable Player : Howard Mojica ( EAC)
 Rookie of the Year: Walt Amber Gervacio ( San Sebastian)

Women's tournament

Elimination round

Playoffs

Awards
 Most Valuable Player : Grethcel Soltones ( San Sebastian)
 Rookie of the Year: Nieza Viray ( San Beda)

Beach volleyball
The NCAA Season 91 beach volleyball tournament will be held on February 10–14, 2016 at the Marina Bay Resort, Subic, Zambales.

Men's tournament

Season host is boldfaced.

Women's tournament

Season host is boldfaced.

Junior's Tournament

Season host is boldfaced.

Football
The football tournament will be start on December 1, 2015, at the Rizal Memorial Coliseum. San Sebastian College Recoletos will be the event host. Each tournament is divided into two rounds. The winner of both rounds faces each other in the Finals; if a single team wins both rounds, that team is declared the champion.

AU Chiefs was crowned as the champion of the men's tournament, defeated the long-time champions San Beda Red Lions, 2–0.

Seniors' tournament

First round

Second round

MVP: Jumbeng Guinabang

Juniors' tournament

First round

Second round

Swimming
The San Beda College men's swimming team extended its domination of the NCAA to a 14th straight year, while its women's team completed a four-peat in the Season 91 swimming event that concluded over the weekend at the Rizal Memorial Swimming Center.

Men's tournament

Season host is boldfaced.

Women's tournament

Season host is boldfaced.

Juniors' tournament

Season host is boldfaced.

Badminton

Men's tournament

Season host is boldfaced.

Women's tournament
 
Season host is boldfaced.

Juniors' tournament

Season host is boldfaced.

Lawn tennis

Men's tournament

Season host is boldfaced.

Juniors' tournament

Season host is boldfaced.

Table tennis

Men's tournament

Season host is boldfaced.

Women's tournament

Season host is boldfaced.

Juniors' tournament

Season host is boldfaced.

Chess

Men's tournament

Season host is boldfaced.

Juniors' tournament

Season host is boldfaced.

Cheerleading

The NCAA Season 91 Cheerleading Competition will be held at the SM Mall of Asia Arena in Pasay on March 8, 2016.

 
Defending champion in boldface"Order" refers to order of performance.

General championship summary
The current point system gives 50 points to the champion team in a certain NCAA event, 40 to the runner-up, and 35 to the third placer. The following points are given in consequent order of finish: 30, 25, 20, 15, 10, 8 and 6.

Seniors' division championships

Medal table

Overall championship tally

Demonstration sports like men's soft tennis, women's lawn tennis, women's badminton, and cheerleading are not included in the overall championship tally, but it is included to the medal table.

Juniors' division championships

Medal table

Overall championship tally

Broadcast coverage
On the formal turn-over ceremony for NCAA and ABS-CBN held on 18 May 2015, these were the changes to be implemented starting Season 91, ABS-CBN and the League have renewed a 10-year contract deal to air NCAA Games until Season 100 (Centennial Season of the NCAA) in 2024. The network will air Men's Basketball, Women's Volleyball (Final Four and Finals) tournaments, and NCAA Cheerleading Competition via ABS-CBN Sports and Action, Balls HD 167 (basketball tournament only), ABS-CBN Sports and Action HD 166 (volleyball tournament)ABS-CBN Sports and Action (international), and sports.abs-cbn.com every Monday, Tuesday, Thursday and Friday afternoons.

Anchors:
Anton Roxas  (Basketball & Volleyball)
Andrei Felix (Basketball & Volleyball)
Boom Labrusca

Analysts (Basketball)
Martin Antonio
Migs Bustos
Allan Gregorio
Mikee Reyes
Olsen Racela

Analysts (Volleyball)
Denden Lazaro
Kiefer Ravena
Melissa Gohing
Michele Gumabao
Aby Maraño

Courtside Reporters:
Myrtle Sarrosa (Basketball)
Ceej Tantengco (Basketball & Volleyball)
Rox Montealegre (Basketball & Volleyball)
Boom Labrusca  (Basketball & Volleyball)

Previous Courtside Reporter of NCAA
Erika Rabara  (Basketball)

See also
UAAP Season 78

References 

2015 in Philippine sport
2016 in Philippine sport
2015 in multi-sport events
2016 in multi-sport events
National Collegiate Athletic Association (Philippines) seasons